Veronika Vladislavovna Zhilina (born 15 May 2008) is a Russian figure skater. She is the 2021 JGP Slovakia champion.

Personal life 

Zhilina was born on 15 May 2008 in Arkhangelsk, Russia. She is a junior high school student and her hobbies include practicing sports. Her younger sister, Alena, is a figure skater as well.

Career

Early years 
Zhilina began skating in 2011, coached by her mother Ludmila Alferova. In 2018, Zhilina relocated from Arkhangelsk to Moscow with her mother and younger sister to train under Eteri Tutberidze, Sergei Dudakov and Sergei Rozanov. At age 10, she won the 2019 Russian Younger Age Championships in junior category, and defended that title the following year at the 2020 edition of the event.

After a year training under Tutberidze and her team, Zhilina and her sister transitioned to Academy Angels of Plushenko alongside former teammates Alexandra Trusova and Alena Kostornaia to follow their coach Sergei Rozanov.

2020–21 season 
Zhilina competed at the 2021 Russian Junior Championships held in Krasnoyarsk. She unsuccessfully attempted a triple Axel during the short program, under-rotating and falling on the jump. In the free skate, Zhilina landed two quad Toes. However, she fell in the triple Lutz and made other mistakes. She finished in twelfth place.

In March, at 2021 Russian Cup Final, Zhilina placed twelfth in short program after falling twice. She placed eighth overall, attempting two quads and a triple Axel during the free skate.

2021–22 season: International junior debut 
Zhilina made her junior international debut at the 2021 JGP Slovakia in September. She placed second after the short with a clean skate. In the free she attempted three quads (Salchow and Toe). The quad Salchow was landed on a quarter, but the first quad Toe combination received positive GOE. She won both the free skating and the overall event. With this performance she qualified for the Junior Grand Prix Final which was to be held in Japan, but it was cancelled due to COVID related concerns.

Zhilina was assigned to compete at the 2021 JGP Poland. However, according to her coach Evgeni Plushenko, she withdrew due to a ligament injury in the ankle joint. She was replaced by compatriot Elizaveta Kulikova.

At the 2022 Russian Junior Championships, she performed her short program cleanly and placed fourth behind Adeliia Petrosian. She fell on all her quad attempts and had a time violation, finishing in twelfth place. At 2022 Russian Cup Final, she finished in fourth place.

Programs

Competitive highlights 

JGP: Junior Grand Prix

Detailed results 
Small medals for short and free programs awarded only at ISU Championships.

Personal ISU bests highlighted in bold.

Junior level

References

External links 
 
 Veronika Zhilina on Instagram

2008 births
Living people
Russian female single skaters
Sportspeople from Arkhangelsk